Sindernbach is a river of North Rhine-Westphalia, Germany, which is 3.58 kilometers in length. It has its source on the east of the mountain Lahnkopf in the Rothaar Mountains in an elevation of 570 meters, and it flows into the river Sieg in the village of Nenkersdorf in an elevation of 365 meters above sea level.

See also
List of rivers of North Rhine-Westphalia

References

Rivers of North Rhine-Westphalia
Rivers of Siegerland
Rivers of Germany